WNRQ is an FM radio station in Nashville, Tennessee, broadcasting on a frequency of 105.9 MHz. Owned and operated by iHeartMedia, it serves counties in northern middle Tennessee and southern central Kentucky. The station's studios are located in Nashville's Music Row district and the transmitter site is located in Brentwood, Tennessee, a Nashville suburb.

History/ownership
WNRQ has previously been the adult contemporary "Star 106," WLAC-FM; the album oriented rock "Rock 106," WKQB; and "The Joy of Nashville," WJYN, the latter reflecting a former easy listening format. Since 1964 it has been the partner station of the historical AM station WLAC, through numerous ownership changes.

In 1998, Dick Broadcasting, owner of WGFX, and SFX Broadcasting, the then-owner of WLAC-FM, agreed to trade the intellectual property of the stations. The trade, to have taken place February 2, 1998, would have moved WLAC-FM to 104.5 FM, and moved WGFX's classic rock format to 105.9 under SFX ownership. However, when the agreement fell apart, SFX decided to go ahead with launching a classic rock format anyway, and flipped WLAC-FM to WNRQ on January 30.

Current format
The current format features a mixture of fairly hard classic rock deemed to be primarily male-oriented; most of the station's playlist first hit middle Tennessee airwaves on the now-country-formatted WKDF during the 1970s and 1980s, as well as WKQB, "Rock 106" (from 1978 to 1981). It was also Nashville's station for the syndicated John Boy and Billy morning show, heard on numerous Southern stations with the same format as WNRQ. The station stopped airing the morning show in the spring of 2020. The latter now being routinely anchored by a different morning show debuted "The Josh Innes Show". The show also airs on WEGR in Memphis and WLLZ (FM) in Detroit.

Former disc jockeys
"Moose" – currently programs WCJK, "96.3 Jack FM," Murfreesboro/Nashville. 

"Proud Mary" – worked before at sister station WRVW, now retired.

"Big Rig" – worked nights, was at WFBQ, now at WXTB.

"Squeegie" – now at WBUZ-FM

"Riley"

"Joe Elvis" – afternoons; let go in August 2013 in favor of automation.

"Tyler"

"Mud" – programming director for the station; also worked nights, then afternoons; now at WBGG-FM.

"Jimmy The K"

"Laura Steele" – also worked at WFBQ in Indianapolis, Indiana; still heard on The Classic Rock Channel.

HD Radio
WNRQ broadcasts two HD Radio channels; WNRQ-HD1 simulcasts the analog station, while WNRQ-HD2 serves as the Nashville affiliate of the Black Information Network, and is the originating channel for translator station W248BQ (97.5 FM).

WNRQ-HD2
WNRQ-HD2 was at first a Clear Channel Communications-provided channel called "Vinyl Vineyard", but due to technical difficulties, the simulcast of sister station 1510 WLAC was moved to the HD2 signal. On August 25, 2014, the WLAC simulcast was replaced by an alternative rock format, branded "Alt 98.3" (reflecting its simulcast on translator station W252CM) made its debut, replacing the WLAC simulcast. On September 2, 2016, the format changed to classic country, branded as "The Big Legend 98.3"; this format served as a brand extension of sister station WSIX-FM. On March 31, 2017, WNRQ-HD2 returned to alternative rock, branded as "Alt 97.5" (reflecting its simulcast on translator W248BQ), featuring the same airstaff as "Alt 98.3" and broadcasts of Nashville Sounds baseball; origination of the "Big Legend 98.3" classic country format moved to WSIX-HD2. On December 16, 2018, WNRQ-HD2 changed its format to gospel music, branded as "97.5 Hallelujah FM".

On June 29, 2020, fifteen iHeart stations in markets with large African American populations, including W248BQ/WNRQ-HD2, began stunting with African American speeches, interspersed with messages such as "Our Voices Will Be Heard" and "Our side of the story is about to be told," with a new format slated to launch on June 30. That day, W248BQ/WNRQ-HD2, along with the other fourteen stations, became the launch stations for the Black Information Network, an African American-oriented all-news network.

WNRQ-HD3
WNRQ-HD3 was a simulcast of sister station WLAC until 2013, when the simulcast moved to WNRQ-HD2. WNRQ-HD3 was then removed; it resumed broadcasting in 2016 carrying Air1, feeding translator station W223BV (92.5 FM) WNRQ-HD3 was again discontinued on January 1, 2020, when Educational Media Foundation, owner of Air1 and W223BV, transferred origination of the translator's programming to the HD2 channel of WLVU.

References

External links
WNRQ official site
WNRQ HD information

FCC History Cards for WNRQ (covering 1953-1981 as WSOK-FM / WHCY / WFMB / WLAC-FM / WKQB / WJYN)

 

NRQ
Classic rock radio stations in the United States
IHeartMedia radio stations
Radio stations established in 1953
1953 establishments in Tennessee